Lacinipolia renigera (kidney-spotted minor or bristly cutworm) is a species of moth of the family Noctuidae. It is endemic to most of North America with the exception of Yukon and Alaska.

The wingspan is 21–30 mm. The moth flies from May to October depending on the location.

The larvae feed on a wide variety of herbaceous plants.

External links
Species info
Bug Guide

Hadeninae
Moths of North America
Moths described in 1829